Ambato may refer to:

 Ambato Department, an administrative division in Catamarca Province, Argentina
 Ambato Canton, Ecuador
 Ambato, Ecuador, a city in Ambato Canton
 Ambato-Boeni, a district in Madagascar
 Ambato Ambarimay, a town and commune in Ambato-Boeni
 Ambato River (disambiguation), multiple rivers
 Ambato, Ambohidratrimo, a town in the district of Ambohidratrimo, Analamanga, Madagascar

See also
 Ampato, a volcano in the Andes of southern Peru